André Looij (born 25 May 1995) is a Dutch former professional racing cyclist, who rode professionally between 2015 and 2020 for , the  and the .

Major results

2014
 1st Stage 1 Le Triptyque des Monts et Châteaux
 1st Stage 6 Tour de Bretagne
 1st Stage 2 Kreiz Breizh Elites
 3rd Ronde van Midden-Nederland
 5th Grand Prix de la Somme
 6th De Kustpijl
 7th Ster van Zwolle
 7th Baronie Breda Classic
 8th Münsterland Giro
2015
 4th Handzame Classic
 4th Münsterland Giro
 9th Grand Prix d'Isbergues
2016
 5th Handzame Classic
 7th Ronde van Limburg
 10th Omloop Mandel-Leie-Schelde
2017
 6th Handzame Classic
 7th Omloop Eurometropool
 8th Nokere Koerse
 9th Münsterland Giro
2018
 1st Himmerland Rundt
 1st Grote Prijs Jean-Pierre Monseré
 4th Ronde van Noord-Holland
 8th Fyen Rundt
 9th Arno Wallaard Memorial

References

External links

1995 births
Living people
Dutch male cyclists
People from De Ronde Venen
Cyclists from Utrecht (province)